Wolfram Ristau (born 26 October 1953) is a German diver. He competed in the men's 10 metre platform event at the 1972 Summer Olympics.

References

External links
 

1953 births
Living people
German male divers
Olympic divers of East Germany
Divers at the 1972 Summer Olympics
People from Jüterbog
Sportspeople from Brandenburg
20th-century German people